The Charity Shoal crater is a  in diameter circular feature that lies submerged beneath the northeast end of Lake Ontario about  southwest of Wolfe Island, and  south of Kingston, Ontario at about latitude 44° 02′ N and longitude 76° 29′ W. It is hypothesized to be a Middle Ordovician impact crater.

History 
On December 5, 1897, the (Steamship) Rosedale grounded upon the rocks of East Charity Shoal in the eastern end of Lake Ontario during a northwest gale. During the summer of 1900, John C. Churchill, Jr. visited Charity Shoal to survey and chart the outlying spur known as East Charity Shoal.

It was first mapped in detail as part of a bathymetric map of Lake Ontario that was compiled from historic data sets by the National Oceanic and Atmospheric Administration's (NOAA) National Geophysical Data Center, the NOAA Great Lakes Environmental Research Laboratory, and the Canadian Hydrographic Service. Based on this bathymetric map and field investigations, it was first proposed in 2001 that Charity Creek Crater is an impact crater. In November 2010 and May 2011, high-resolution bathymetric and acoustic backscatter data were collected from the area of Charity Shoal and a 1 by 1 m grid model of its bathymetry was assembled by the Canadian Hydrographic Service. In July 2012, detailed magnetic and bathymetric surveys were conducted across a  area over Charity Shoal.

Morphology 
The exterior slopes of its rim are less steep than its interior slopes. Northeast-southwest trending erosional valleys cut across the southwestern sector of the crater rim.

From the Charity Shoal Crater, a prominent, elongated, and tapering ridge extends about  southwestward away from its rim and gives it the appearance of a frying pan. In addition, numerous smaller northeast–southwest trending linear features cut Charity Shoal Crater and cover the entire northeastern end of Lake Ontario.

The Charity Shoal Crater and associated ridge both lie upon a broader and larger flat-topped ridge. This larger ridge is one of a series of several N23E-trending ridge segments that lie between Main Duck and Wolfe Islands and just northwest of the  Saint Lawrence Channel. The Simcoe Island Channel lies on the opposite side of this ridge. This ridge, the Charity Shoal Crater, and the entire northeast end of Lake Ontario are all crosscut N53E-trending lineations. These lineations, which were likely created by subglacial erosion, form a well-defined en echelon topography that characterize the bottom of Lake Ontario.

Surface geology 
The surface of the Charity Shoal Crater consists of a mixture of bedrock, broken bedrock, and lacustrine sediments. The rim of this feature consists of eroded bedrock and patches of broken bedrock. Broken bedrock covers the interior and exterior slopes of the feature. Loose rocks recovered from the inner slope of the west–central portion of the crater rim consisted mainly of sandstone, quartzite, and gneiss that are glacial erratics derived from exposures of Precambrian, Cambrian, and Ordovician strata to the northeast. Of these rocks, two specimens consist of fossiliferous limestone and are thought to be representative of local bedrock. Neither shatter cones nor breccia were reported as having been observed among these rocks.

Planar parallel reflections, which are interpreted as laminated (post-glacial-Holocene?) muds and silt, comprise the upper  of the crater fill. These sediments overlie an acoustically transparent unit that is largely devoid of reflections. This unit represents poorly-stratified unconsolidated sediment that likely consists of sand and gravel.

The ridge that extends southwestward from the crater consists of bedrock that is capped by unstratified gravelly and sandy sediment that resembles a medial moraine. The orientation of this ridge parallels other northwest–southeast-trending ridges, lineations, and features that cut through the rim of the Charity Shoal Crater and the bedrock bottom of Lake Ontario.

Bedrock geology 
The bottom of Lake Ontario within the area of the Charity Shoal Crater consists of Middle Ordovician limestone belonging to the Trenton Group. They are hard erosion-resistant strata that dip very gently to the southwest. As a result, the Trenton Group forms the lake bottom over a wide area although it is only hundreds of meters thick. These Middle Ordovician strata overlie thin Cambrian sandstones which in turn rest unconformably on Late Proterozoic basement rocks. The basement rocks are part of the Frontenac Terrane of the Grenville Province. Thus, they most likely consist of high-grade gneisses, marble and quartzite.

High-resolution multibeam sonar data collected in November 2010 and May 2011 revealed that the rim of the crater consists of undisturbed and unbrecciated bedrock that has been almost completely stripped of sediments and debris by erosion. This ring anticline coincides with the crater rim, with rock strata dipping gently in both directions away from the rim axis. The ring anticline is more nearly circular, in contrast to the ovoid shape of the Charity Shoal topographic crater floor. The dips of exposed rock strata are generally gentle and lack any evidence of beds being overturned or even vertical.

Evidence of shock metamorphism 
No evidence of shock metamorphism has been reported from the Charity Shoal Crater. This is likely because, in situ samples from the sedimentary strata underlying the layers Middle Ordovician limestone that still cover the rim of this feature have not been collected from it. Drilling and coring of this feature will be required to recover any evidence of shock metamorphism and verify the impact origin of the Charity Shoal Crater.

Origin 
The ring anticline that forms the bulk of the rim of the Charity Shoal Crater is interpreted to consist of layers of Middle Ordovician limestone that are draped over the still buried rim of an underlying crater. The microridges are argued to be edges of these limestone beds that have been truncated by erosion, which is presumed to be glacial in nature. Based upon its circular shape, lack of local and regional volcanism, and geophysical anomalies, the Charity Shoal Crater is hypothesized to be an extraterrestrial impact crater. As a result of modelling of data collected during a magnetic survey of this feature, Philip Suttak concluded that Charity Shoal Crater is neither 
a shallow glacial erosional, nor karst sinkhole.

The ridge that extends southwestward from the crater is judged to represent a till ridge or bedrock fluting (crag-and-tail feature). Crag-and-tail features are a common occurrence in some drumlin fields. It likely formed below the southwestward-flowing Laurentide Ice Sheet during the last glaciation. Other streamlined erosional features, e.g., oriented bedrock ridges and troughs, flat-topped ridges, and bedrock lineations, indicate that the bottom of this part of Lake Ontario, including Charity Shoal, has been significantly modified by glacial erosion.

Age 
Currently, the age of the Charity Shoal Crater is argued to Middle Ordovician. The presence of continuous and well-defined northeast-trending lineations that cut across both the Charity Shoal Crater and adjacent bedrock indicates that this landform has been significantly eroded by glacial processes and predates the last glacial advance of the Laurentide Ice Sheet. As the existing research indicates that the rim of this crater is draped by layers of Middle Ordovician limestone, the Charity Shoal Crater must be at least as old as the Middle Ordovician. That its rim height is 80 to 90 percent lower than predicted by cratering models indicates that the relief has been diminished by the filling of the central basin with sediments after its formation.

See also 
 Bloody Creek crater
 Corossol crater
 Ordovician

References

External links 
 Map : Charity Shoal, Bathymetry of Lake Ontario. National Geophysical Data Center, World Data Center A for Marine Geology & Geophysics, Boulder CO. Rept. MGG–14. last accessed June 26, 2014.
 Map : West and East Kingston, Bathymetry of Lake Ontario. National Geophysical Data Center, World Data Center A for Marine Geology & Geophysics, Boulder CO. Rept. MGG–14. last accessed June 26, 2014.
 * O’Dale, C., no date. Exploration of the Charity Shoal crater, Crater explorer. last accessed April 3, 2019.

Impact craters of Ontario
Possible impact craters on Earth
Ordovician impact craters
Lake Ontario